Dunston may refer to:

Places in England
 Dunston, Tyne and Wear, in the Metropolitan Borough of Gateshead
 Dunston railway station
 Dunston Power Station, now demolished
 Dunston, Lincolnshire, a small village
 Dunston, Norfolk, a small village
 Dunston, Staffordshire, a small village
 Dunston, Derbyshire; see Lenton Priory
 Dunstone, Devon; see List of places in Devon

Other uses
 Dunston (surname)
 Dunston UTS F.C., a football club based in Dunston, Tyne and Wear, England

See also

Dunstan (disambiguation)